Thad Joseph Jakubowski (April 5, 1924 – July 14, 2013) was an American Catholic titular bishop of Plestia and auxiliary bishop of the Roman Catholic Archdiocese of Chicago, Illinois

Born in Chicago, Illinois, Jakubowski was ordained for the Chicago Archdiocese on May 3, 1950. He was appointed bishop on February 18, 1988, and was ordained bishop on April 11, 1988. He retired on January 24, 2003, and died on July 14, 2013.

Notes

Clergy from Chicago
21st-century Roman Catholic bishops in the United States
1924 births
2013 deaths
American people of Polish descent
Roman Catholic Archdiocese of Chicago
Religious leaders from Illinois
Catholics from Illinois
20th-century Roman Catholic bishops in the United States